Go is the fifth studio album by Japanese rapper Kreva, released through Pony Canyon on September 8, 2011. It is Kreva's first studio album in two years. Kreva explained, "It's my fifth album so I called it Go". Go produced three singles, including the top ten hit "Idome".

The album was released in three formats: limited CD+DVD edition, limited CD+T-shirt edition, and standard CD-only edition. The album's title is reiterated in the price of the CD+T-shirt edition (5,555 yen) as well as its catalog number (PCCA-9855).

Background
Kreva described the album as an "ode to his fans". In a press release issued on August 1, 2011, he spoke about the album's direction:

Commercial performance 
Go debuted at number 2 on the Oricon Daily Albums chart on September 6, 2011, selling 5,398 copies. The album climbed to number 1 the following day with 7,337 copies sold. It sold 5,840 copies on September 8 and 3,269 copies on September 9, remaining at number 1. On September 10, the album fell to number 2, with 2,978 copies sold, and then to number 4 on September 11. Despite remaining at number 1 for most of the week, Go peaked at number 2 on the Oricon Weekly Albums chart, selling 28,132 copies in its first week, 2,132 copies less than the second week sales of Ayumi Hamasaki's Five, which claimed the top spot. It dropped four spots to number 6 on its second week, selling 6,857 copies.

Track listing

Charts and sales

References 

2011 albums
Pony Canyon albums
Japanese-language albums